A foreign national wishing to enter Eswatini must obtain a visa unless they are a citizen of one of the eligible visa exempt countries.

Visa policy map

Visa exemption 

Holders of passports of the following 94 jurisdictions do not require a visa to enter Eswatini for visits up to 30 days:

In May 2019, it was announced that Eswatini was planning to introduce a visa on arrival system.

Visitor statistics
Most visitors arriving to Eswatini were from the following countries of nationality:

See also 

 Visa requirements for Swazi citizens
 Foreign relations of Eswatini

References

External links 
Immigrants requiring visa to enter Eswatini

Eswatini
Foreign relations of Eswatini